Samuel Sandys ( – 4 August 1701) was an English politician, MP for Droitwich in five Parliaments.

The son of Sir Samuel Sandys , he succeeded his father as MP for Droitwich in 1661, when his father became MP for the county. His father became MP for Droitwich again in 1681; the son succeeded him again in 1685. Sandys was re-elected in 1689, and stood for the county in 1690, but withdrew when he appeared likely to win.

Sandys died on 4 August 1701, aged 64, and was buried at Ombersley.

Family
Sandys married Elizabeth Pettus, daughter of Sir John Pettus . They had three sons and four daughters:
 Edwin Sandys  (1659–1699)
 Henry Sandys (died young)
 Martin Sandys (1672–1753), Fellow of New College, Oxford, barrister, Town Clerk of Worcester
 Elizabeth Sandys (died young)
 Penelope Sandys, married Henry Townshend
 Mary Sandys (died 14 January 1729), married Price Devereux, 9th Viscount Hereford
 Frances Sandys, married Samuel Pytts

References

1630s births
1701 deaths
English MPs 1661–1679
English MPs 1679
English MPs 1680–1681
English MPs 1685–1687
English MPs 1689–1690
Members of the Parliament of England for Droitwich